William Charles Evans F.R.S. (1 October 1911-24 July 1988) was an eminent biochemist who spent most of his career at the University College of North Wales, Bangor.

References

External links 
 

1911 births
1988 deaths
Welsh biochemists
Academics of Bangor University
Welsh pharmacologists
Fellows of the Royal Society